Declan Hegarty is an Irish Olympic hammer thrower. He represented his country at the 1984 Summer Olympics. His best toss in those Olympics was a 70.56, while his personal best, set in 1985, was a 77.80.

References

1960 births
Living people
Irish male hammer throwers
Olympic athletes of Ireland
Athletes (track and field) at the 1984 Summer Olympics